Bad Brains (also known as The Yellow Tape or Attitude: The ROIR Sessions) is the debut studio album recorded by American hardcore punk/reggae band Bad Brains. Recorded in 1981 and released on the cassette-only label ROIR on February 5, 1982, many fans refer to it as "The Yellow Tape" because of its yellow packaging, much in the way that the Beatles' self-titled record is often called "The White Album". Though Bad Brains had recorded the 16 song Black Dots album in 1979 and the 5-song Omega Sessions EP in 1980, the ROIR cassette was the band's first release of anything longer than a single.

Background and recording
After being banned from all the major clubs in their hometown of Washington, DC, Bad Brains moved to New York City in 1981. In addition to their regular gigs at CBGB's, the band frequented Jerry Williams' 171-A Studios in Alphabet City. Named for its location between 10th and 11th Streets on Avenue A, 171-A was a 60-foot room with a stage at one end and an elevated sound-proof booth at the other. When the Bad Brains played a gig at 171-A in May 1981, Williams recorded it on reel-to-reel tape. The band liked the sound and returned to 171-A  to record between August and October 1981. 12 of the 15 tracks on the album came from these sessions, while "Jah Calling", "Pay to Cum" and "I Luv I Jah", were from Williams' live recording in May.

Release 
Bad Brains was originally released on February 5, 1982, in cassette-only format on Reachout International Records (ROIR). The cover art depicts DC's Capitol Building being struck by a bolt of lightning. The original cover art unfolded to include a photo of the band, album credits, lyrics to all the songs, and liner notes by then New York Rocker and Soho News critic Ira Kaplan, who would later front the band Yo La Tengo. Rather than label the tape's sides A/B or one/two, the band designated them Side 1/Side A.

The original edition of the cassette had a white spine on the J-card and a red or yellow cassette shell.  Subsequent editions had an all-yellow J-card with either red, gold, or green cassette shells, in a nod toward the band's Rastafarian leanings. Later versions appeared in solid white, solid orange, solid yellow and transparent red tape shells. Because the yellow cassette shell was most common and it came in a matching yellow package, many fans referred to it as "The Yellow Tape".

Bad Brains EP
In 1981 the Dead Kennedys' record label Alternative Tentacles opened an office in the United Kingdom to issue special editions of records by American punk bands for the UK market. The single version of "Pay to Cum" had appeared on the Alternative Tentacles compilation Let Them Eat Jellybeans! and with the ROIR sessions available, a few songs were selected for a 1982 UK release as a 12-inch EP. The record's sleeve featured the same lightning-strikes-the-Capitol art that appeared on the ROIR cassette, and the back cover had the inner J-card's band photo, credits, lyrics, and Kaplan's liner notes. The record also mimicked the tape's Side 1/Side A aesthetic, differing in that one side was reggae and the other hardcore punk, unlike the cassette, which interspersed the two genres. Because Alternative Tentacles UK was a short-lived venture, the Bad Brains EP is rare, and for eight years was the only appearance of these songs on vinyl.

Track listing

Reception and influence 
Reviewing for The Village Voice in 1982, Robert Christgau said, "Turn a fusion band into hardcore propheteers and you end up with fast heavy metal. The best kind for damn sure, especially since they turn their rage into Positive Mental Attitude. I like it fine. But great punks give up more than a salubrious blur."

The album was a crucial step in the evolution of hardcore punk and the eventual fusion of hard rock and reggae adopted later by bands like Sublime, Fishbone, and 311.

Adam Yauch of Beastie Boys was quoted as saying that this album is "the best punk/hardcore album of all time".

To this day, many people involved in the hardcore scene regard it as one of the greatest hardcore albums of all time and a groundbreaking release for the hardcore punk genre.

Reissues 
In 1989, In-Effect Records released a CD version, with the same track listing, titled Attitude: The ROIR Sessions.

In 1990, Dutch East India Trading, through its imprint Homestead Records, was the first label to release the album on vinyl in the United States.

In 1996, ROIR reissued the original album on CD, featuring a hidden bonus track, followed by an on LP version the following year.

Bad Brains regained the rights to the album from ROIR in 2020, and reissued the album on vinyl, CD, and digital outlets on their own Bad Brains Records imprint via a pressing and distribution with ORG Music. A limited edition pressing of the album with Blue Note Records-inspired cover art and layout scheme, designed by former Alternative Tentacles graphic artist John Yates, was released at the same time as the original cover's reissue, on translucent green vinyl.

Re-recordings 
Many of the album's tracks were re-recorded for their 1983 follow-up, Rock for Light, with the exception of "Don't Need It", "The Regulator", "Jah Calling", "Leaving Babylon", "Pay to Cum", "I Luv I Jah". The instrumental final track on Bad Brains, titled "Intro", became the first nine seconds of Rock for Lights title song.

 Cover versions 
 Ho99o9 has played "Attitude" live on multiple occasions and continues to do so. "Attitude" was also covered by H2O on their album Don't Forget Your Roots.
 "Leaving Babylon" was covered by Jesse Malin on his covers album, On Your Sleeve; by 311 for their 1999 album Soundsystem; and live by Living Colour and HIM.
 Sublime often performed Bad Brains tunes during live shows. The deluxe edition of their Sublime album included "I Luv I Jah", reworked with different lyrics as "I Love My Dog". The DVD of their Everything Under the Sun also contained a live version of "Leaving Babylon".
 John Frusciante of Red Hot Chili Peppers covered "Big Takeover" on his first solo album, Niandra Lades and Usually Just a T-Shirt. He also covered a short acoustic rendition of "Sailin On'" during a 1989 interview.
 "Sailin' On" was covered by No Doubt for the MOM: Music for Our Mother Ocean album series; by Moby for the Never Give In: A Tribute to Bad Brains (1999, Century Media) tribute album; by Soulfly for the special edition of their album Conquer; by HIM in a live version recorded for the record Uneasy Listening Vol. 2; and live by Living Colour. Hardcore punk band Sailing On were also named for the song.
 "I Luv I Jah" was covered live by Long Beach Dub Allstars, featuring H.R. on vocals; it appeared on their rare 1998 first album, LBDA & Friends.
 "Supertouch/Shitfit" was covered by Hatebreed on their covers album, For the Lions, and was sampled by experimental hip hop group Death Grips on the song "Takyon (Death Yon)" from their mixtape Exmilitary.
 Santigold and Diplo covered "Right Brigade" on their 2008 mixtape Top Ranking: A Diplo Dub.
 "I" was covered by Mark Kozelek on his 2013 covers album, Like Rats, in a stripped-down acoustic version highlighting the lyrics.
 "Sailin' On" was covered by Stone Sour on their second 2015 covers EP Straight Outta Burbank...
 "Fearless Vampire Killers" was covered by 88 Fingers Louie on their 1998 Back on the Streets album.
 "Right Brigade" has been regularly performed by the Deftones during their live shows.
Cave In covered "I Luv I Jah" for the Never Give In: A Tribute to Bad Brains tribute album. It also appeared on their compilation record Anomalies Vol. 1.
Ignite covered "Banned in DC" on their split 7-inch with Good Riddance in 1996. Their cover also appeared as a bonus track on the 2014 CD reissue of their 1996 EP Past Our Means. It appears on subsequent vinyl pressings as well.

Appearances in other media
In 2008, the song "Right Brigade" was included in the video game Grand Theft Auto IV, for its reproduction through the in-game radio station Liberty City Hardcore (LCHC).

 Track listing 

 Personnel Bad Brains H.R. – lead vocals
 Dr. Know – guitar, backing vocals
 Darryl Jenifer – bass, backing vocals
 Earl Hudson – drums, backing vocalsProduction'''
 Jay Dublee – producer, recording, mixing
 Bad Brains – mixing
 Wayne Vlcan – engineer
 Stanley Moskowitz – mastering
 Donna Parsons (from Ratcage) – cover art
 Ira Kaplan – liner notes
 Donnell Gibson; Jay Jones – logo design
 Laura Levine – photography
 Neil Cooper – cover concept

 Notes 

 References 

 External links 
 Bad Brains official site
 ROIR Records official site
 Norton, Justin M. (October 17, 2012). "13 Essential DC Hardcore Albums: Bad Brains – Bad Brains (ROIR, 1982)". Stereogum''.

Bad Brains albums
ROIR albums
1982 debut albums